KUWW (90.9 FM) is a radio station licensed to Fort Washakie, Wyoming, United States. The station is currently owned by the University of Wyoming and is an affiliate of Wyoming Public Radio.

References

External links
 

UWW
UWW
NPR member stations
Radio stations established in 2010
2010 establishments in Wyoming